Crimson: Steam Pirates is a strategy iOS game developed by Harebrained Schemes and published by Bungie Aerospace Corporation and released on September 1, 2011.  The game was designed by Harebrained Schemes co-founder Jordan Weisman, who had previously created the Crimson Skies franchise.

Critical reception

The game received "generally favorable reviews" according to the review aggregation website Metacritic.

References

2011 video games
Harebrained Schemes games
IOS games
IOS-only games
Strategy video games
Video games about pirates
Video games developed in the United States
Video games set in the Caribbean